Maaike Head (born 11 September 1983 in Amsterdam) is a Dutch rower.  She competed in the lightweight double sculls at the 2012 Summer Olympics and the 2016 Summer Olympics. In the latter, she won the gold medal together with Ilse Paulis.

Career 
In 2016, Head and Paulis broke the world record in the lightweight double sculls.

Before rowing, she participated in speed skating, winning a gold medal in the team pursuit at the 2003 World Junior Championships in Kushiro, Japan, and participating in Dutch Allround Championships.

References

External links
 
 
 
 

1983 births
Living people
Dutch female rowers
Dutch female speed skaters
Rowers at the 2012 Summer Olympics
Rowers at the 2016 Summer Olympics
Olympic rowers of the Netherlands
Olympic gold medalists for the Netherlands
Olympic medalists in rowing
Rowers from Amsterdam
World Rowing Championships medalists for the Netherlands
Medalists at the 2016 Summer Olympics
Knights of the Order of Orange-Nassau
European Rowing Championships medalists
21st-century Dutch women
20th-century Dutch women